Family Business is an album by Ronnie Penque.  His second solo album, it was released on August 30, 2019.

Ronnie Penque is a singer, songwriter, and musician.  He is perhaps best known for playing bass guitar in the band New Riders of the Purple Sage.  The musicians on Family Business include NRPS members Buddy Cage, David Nelson, Michael Falzarano, and Johnny Markowski, along with other like-minded musical artists such as Mark Karan and Mookie Siegel.

Critical reception 
In the Asbury Park Press, Alex Biese wrote, "The album, recorded at the Jam Room Music Complex in Howell, is a lush, 10-track survey of the jammier side of American music, from the adventurous anthem "Wookie Kids" to the lush and tender ballad "Wondering" and the country-rock shimmer of "Emma Lynn". Half the album has the distinct, shining presence of Penque's New Riders bandmate Buddy Cage on pedal steel guitar."

Track listing 
All songs written by Ronnie Penque except where noted.
"Crawford" – 4:04
"Midnight Medicine" (Penque, Deborah Grabien) – 5:35
"Wookie Kids" (Penque, Michael Falzarano) – 6:54
"Emma Lynn" – 3:15
"Wondering" – 6:12
"Shave That Rock" – 5:41
"Will I See You Tonight" – 3:16
"The Fugitive" (Casey Anderson, Liz Anderson) – 3:12
"Wish You Luck" – 6:08
"That's All" – 5:01

Personnel 
Musicians
Ronnie Penque – bass guitar, acoustic guitar, 12-string acoustic guitar, lead vocals
Arnie Brown – electric guitar, vocals
Buddy Cage – pedal steel guitar
Clay Cassell – drums, percussion
Mark Diomede – electric guitar
Michael Falzarano – electric guitar, acoustic guitar
Mike Flynn – acoustic guitar, electric guitar, lap steel guitar
Kenny Harten – fiddle
Mark Karan – electric guitar
Sandy Mack – harmonica
Johnny Markowski – drums
David Nelson – electric guitar, vocals
Jeff Pearlman – piano, organ, vocals
Katie Pearlman – drums, vocals
Chris Penque – electric guitar, electric slide guitar
James Saluzzi – electric guitar, vocals
Mookie Siegel – organ, accordion
Drave Taylor – piano, organ
Production
Produced by Ronnie Penque
Mixing: Arnie Brown, Ronnie Penque
Mastering: Dennis Drake
Additional recording: Peter Francovilla
Design: Ronnie Penque, Russ Paladino
Photography: Bob Minkin, Suzy Perler, Vernon Webb, JM Hartl

References 

Ronnie Penque albums
2019 albums